Ibrahim Meité (born 18 November 1976) is a Côte d'Ivoire sprinter who specializes in the 100 and 200 metres.

Biography
Meité finished seventh in 4 x 100 metres relay at the 1993 World Championships, together with teammates Ouattara Lagazane, Jean-Olivier Zirignon and Frank Waota.

Participating in the 2000 Summer Olympics, he achieved fourth place in his heat, thus failing to make it through to the second round.

His personal best time in the 200 m is 20.64 seconds, achieved in June 1994 in Narbonne. This is the current national record. He also co-holds the national 4 × 100 m relay record of 38.60 seconds with teammates Ahmed Douhou, Yves Sonan and Eric Pacome N'Dri, achieved at the 2001 World Championships in Edmonton.

References

External links

1976 births
Living people
Ivorian male sprinters
Athletes (track and field) at the 1996 Summer Olympics
Athletes (track and field) at the 2000 Summer Olympics
Olympic athletes of Ivory Coast